Lt. Col. Ahmed Ould Bouceif (1934 – 27 May 1979) was a Mauritanian military and political leader. In April 1979, he seized power in a coup d'état together with Col. Mohamed Khouna Ould Haidallah and other officers, ousting Col. Mustafa Ould Salek from power. He became the 2nd Prime Minister of Mauritania in the new government. He was killed the following month in an airplane crash off the coast of Dakar, Senegal, at which point Haidallah emerged as the regime's main strongman.

References

1934 births
1979 deaths
Mauritanian military personnel
State leaders killed in aviation accidents or incidents
Victims of aviation accidents or incidents in Senegal